Waterworld is the debut album from Michigan hip hop duo Binary Star. The album was self-released, with only 1,000 copies printed. A rearranged, remixed version was created the following year, Masters of the Universe, with wider distribution.

The entire album was recorded, mixed and mastered on a $500 budget.  Consequently, all verses were recorded in one take.

Track listing

External links 
 Releases - WaterWorld — Subterraneous Records

1999 albums
Binary Star (hip hop group) albums